Martin Castillo may refer to:
 Martin Castillo (Miami Vice character), fictional character in TV series Miami Vice, played by Edward James Olmos
 Martín Castillo, Mexican boxer
 Marty Castillo, baseball player
 Martín Castillo (footballer) (born 1988), Mexican footballer)